Greensburg is a city in, and the county seat of, Kiowa County, Kansas, United States. As of the 2020 United States census, the population of the city was 740. It is home to the world's largest hand-dug well. On the evening of May 4, 2007, Greensburg was devastated by an EF5 tornado that leveled at least 95 percent of the city and killing eleven people between the ages of 46 and 84. Today, Greensburg stands as a model "green town", often described as the greenest in America. The hospital, city hall, and school have all been built to the highest certification level issued by Leadership in Energy and Environmental Design (LEED).

History

Early history

For millennia, the Great Plains of North America were inhabited by nomadic Native Americans.

19th century
The first settlement was made at Greensburg in 1885. Greensburg was named for D.R. "Cannonball" Green, who owned a stagecoach company and who helped to form the city. In 1887, construction began on the Big Well, the largest hand-dug well in the world. In 1888, Greensburg was advertised as the "liveliest town in the state." In the same year, the Big Well finished construction.

20th century
The Big Well stopped being a source of the city's water in 1932.

One of the largest pallasite meteorites ever discovered was found near Greensburg in 1949, weighing over 1,000 pounds.

In 1972, the Big Well was declared a national museum.

21st century

At 9:45 p.m. CDT on May 4, 2007, during a deadly tornado outbreak, Greensburg was hit by an EF5 tornado. Ninety-five percent of the city was confirmed to be destroyed, with the other five percent being severely damaged. The National Weather Service estimated winds of the tornado to reach . This was the first tornado to be rated EF5 since the implementation of the Enhanced Fujita scale earlier that year and the first F5 or EF5 classification since May 3, 1999, when an F5 tornado ripped through Moore, Oklahoma, as part of the 1999 Oklahoma tornado outbreak. Tornado sirens sounded in the city twenty minutes before the tornado struck, and a tornado emergency was issued, which likely saved many lives. The tornado lasted for a total of one hour and five minutes and caused $250 million in damages.

Kansas Governor Kathleen Sebelius and President George W. Bush both declared Kiowa County a disaster area, which opened up the affected areas for national and international aid. The tornado took 10 lives in Greensburg and two more in neighboring towns. While some rebuilding was done, the population by 2010 was about 50% of what it was in 2000, as the 2000 census found 1,574 residents, while only 777 were recorded in the 2010 census.

After the tornado, the city council passed a resolution stating that all city buildings would be built to LEED — platinum standards, making it the first city in the nation to do so. Greensburg is rebuilding as a "green" town, with the help of Greensburg GreenTown, a non-profit organization created to help the residents learn about and implement the green living initiative. With extra help from the Federal Emergency Management Agency, Greensburg residents developed a long-term plan for Greensburg. The city's power is supplied by ten 1.25 MW wind-turbines. Carbon offsets generated from the turbines are being managed by NativeEnergy, and have been purchased by charter supporters including Ben & Jerry's, Clif Bar, Green Mountain Coffee Roasters, and Stonyfield Farm. Greensburg also has numerous electric vehicle charging stations and complimentary bikes.

Geography
Greensburg is located at coordinates  (37.6027963, -99.2926131).

Climate
The climate in this area is characterized by hot, humid summers and generally mild to cool winters. Under the Köppen Climate Classification system, Greensburg has a humid subtropical climate, abbreviated "CFA" on climate maps.

Demographics

2000 census
As of the 2000 United States Census, there were 1,574 people, 730 households, and 453 families in the city. The racial makeup of the city was 97.01% White, 0.83% Native American, 0.06% Asian, 1.02% from other races, and 1.08% from two or more races. Hispanic or Latino of any race were 1.59% of the population.

There were 730 households, out of which 23.8% had children under the age of 18 living with them, 53.3% were married couples living together, 6.2% had a female householder with no husband present, and 37.9% were non-families. 35.9% of all households were made up of individuals, and 19.9% had someone living alone who was 65 years of age or older. The average household size was 2.14 and the average family size was 2.76.

The city population contained 21.5% under the age of 18, 6.5% from 18 to 24, 20.5% from 25 to 44, 25.2% from 45 to 64, and 26.4% who were 65 years of age or older. The median age was 46 years. For every 100 females, there were 91.0 males. For every 100 females age 18 and over, there were 88.1 males.

The median income for a household in the city was $28,438, and the median income for a family was $39,188. Males had a median income of $28,426 versus $20,875 for females. The per capita income for the city was $18,054. About 8.4% of families and 12.4% of the population were below the poverty line, including 16.6% of those under age 18 and 8.0% of those age 65 or over.

2010 census
As of the 2010 United States Census, there were 777 people, 355 households, and 212 families in the city. The racial makeup of the city was 95.5% White, 0.4% African American, 1.0% Native American, 0.4% Asian, 1.4% from other races, and 1.3% from two or more races. Hispanic or Latino of any race were 3.9% of the population.

There were 355 households, of which 24.8% had children under the age of 18 living with them, 48.2% were married couples living together, 8.2% had a female householder with no husband present, 3.4% had a male householder with no wife present, and 40.3% were non-families. 36.9% of all households were made up of individuals, and 16.3% had someone living alone who was 65 years of age or older. The average household size was 2.18 and the average family size was 2.83.

The median age in the city was 45.2 years. The city population contained 22% of residents under the age of 18; 5.2% were between the ages of 18 and 24; 22.6% were from 25 to 44; 27.9% were from 45 to 64; and 22.3% were 65 years of age or older. The gender makeup of the city was 47.4% male and 52.6% female.

2020 census
As of the 2020 United States Census, there were 740 people, and 365 households. The racial makeup of the city was 88.6% White, 2.2% African American, 0.3% Native American, 1.7% Asian, 0.4% from other races, and 6.1% from two or more races. Hispanic or Latino of any race were 2.6% of the population.

There were 365 households. The average household size was 3.11 and the average family size was 3.09.

The median age in the city was 45.6 years. The city population contained 25.3% of residents under the age of 18; 74.7% were between the ages of 18 and 64; and 24.0% were 65 years of age or older.

The median household income was $40,729.

Education
The community is served by Kiowa County USD 422 public school district.  Greensburg schools were closed through school unification. The Greensburg Rangers won the Kansas State High School boys class B basketball championship in 1948.

As of the 2019 American Community Survey 5-Year Estimates, 82.35% of School Enrolled Population are Enrolled in Kindergarten to 12th Grade in Greensburg. 27.4% of residents have a High School or Equivalent degree, 27.4% have some college but no degree, 8.6% have an associate degree, 16.8% have a bachelor's degree, and 7.2% have a Graduates or Professional degree.

Attractions

Greensburg is home to the world's largest hand dug well. Work had begun on the well in 1887 to provide water for the steam engines of the Atchison, Topeka and Santa Fe Railway and Chicago, Rock Island and Pacific Railroad. The well was used as the city's water supply until 1932. In 1939 it was opened as a tourist attraction allowing visitors to descend to the bottom of the well.

The adjacent museum displayed a 1000-pound pallasite meteorite until the museum fell down around the meteorite during the 2007 tornado that destroyed the city. The meteorite was found in the rubble of the museum and moved to a temporary home in Hays, Kansas while Greensburg was rebuilding. In May 2012, the new Big Well Museum and Visitor Information Center opened featuring exhibits about the history of Greensburg, The Big Well, the 2007 tornado, the rebuilding process, and the meteorite.

On October 16, 2006, a related smaller meteorite measuring 154 pounds (70 kilograms) was dug up near Greensburg and Haviland. The only scientific publication discussing time of impact suggests a terrestrial age of 20,000 years. It was once thought that its age was around 10,000 years.

The town serves as a time station for the annual Race Across America, a  transcontinental bicycle race.

The 5.4.7 Arts Center serves as a non-profit organization for hosting visual and performative arts, and acts as the only arts center between Dodge City, Kansas and Wichita, Kansas.

The Kiowa County Historical Museum and Soda Fountain operates as a museum for Kiowa County. It contains artifacts and information from the westward expansion of the United States fueled by ideas of Manifest Destiny. It also contains local history including sporting equipment and notable people from around Kiowa County.

West of Greensburg, the M.T. Liggett Art Environment offers a kinetic art display that utilizes pieces of discarded metal along with wind energy to create a roadside attraction.

The Fromme-Birney Round Barn is a notable horse barn that was built in 1912. It is listed on the National Register of Historic Places.

Transportation
Greensburg is served by three U.S. Highways:
, 
.

Bus service is provided daily eastward towards Wichita, Kansas and westward towards Pueblo, Colorado by BeeLine Express (subcontractor of Greyhound Lines).

Media
Several television networks have drawn an interest in Greensburg as a subject for reality shows as a result of the Greensburg City Council's decision to make the city a "green" town. A documentary on its reconstruction, called Greensburg, aired on Planet Green, a sister network of Discovery Channel.

Another documentary, Earth 2100, drew attention to Greensburg as "the green town" that was built after the devastating 2007 tornado. The ABC film suggested a fictionalized, future Greensburg as a model showing how American towns can successfully implement green technology, and become a beacon for hope on a planet doomed to destruction from climate change and overpopulation.

Multiple books have been written about Greensburg and the 2007 tornado. Greensburg: The Twisted Tales (Janice Haney) recounts several residents' experiences with the tornado. Aftermath: Scenes from the Sudden Destruction of an American Hometown (Merlin Peck) showcases images of destruction and debris from the event.

Notable people
 Manvel H. Davis, Republican loser to Harry S. Truman in 1940 U.S. senatorial Missouri campaign
 Dennis McKinney, Kansas State Treasurer 2008-2010
 Sandra Seacat, actress and acting coach

Gallery

See also
 Big Well
 Brenham (meteorite)

References

Further reading

External links

Official sites
 City of Greensburg
 Greensburg - Directory of Public Officials

2007 tornado
 Damage: Article 1, Article 2, Article 3
 Recovery: Article 1, Article 2, Article 3, Article 4 , Article 5 
 Before: Photos before 2007 tornado
 , from Hatteberg's People on KAKE TV news

Other sites
 Kiowa County Signal
 Greensburg city map

Cities in Kansas
County seats in Kansas
Cities in Kiowa County, Kansas